Clover Vail (born 1939) is an American artist. Vail received a MacDowell fellowship in 1989. In 2004 Vail received a $25,000 grant from the Adolph and Esther Gottlieb Foundation.

Collections
Her work is included in the collections of the Smithsonian American Art Museum,
the Metropolitan Museum of Art and the Cleveland Museum of Art.

References

1939 births
Living people
20th-century American women artists
21st-century American women artists
People from Lausanne